Crabs in a Bucket is the third studio album by English rapper Nines, released on 28 August 2020 by Zino Records and Warner Records. It is the follow-up to Nines' second album Crop Circle (2018). The album features guest appearances from Headie One, Roy Woods, Nafe Smallz, NorthSideBenji, NSG, Tiggs da Author, among others. It reached number one on the UK Albums Chart.

The album was supported by lead single "Clout", peaking at number 49 on the UK Singles Chart, and "Airplane Mode" featuring NSG.

Recording
The album was recorded in various locations, with Nines saying: "I was in different countries—Spain, Paris, Dubai—when I was making this album. That's why it took a bit of time. I would go sometimes three months without recording. But you know what they say: When you're uninspired, the best thing is to do other things."

Promotion
The lead single, "Clout", was released on 10 August 2020 for digital download. A music video was released on the same day directed by Charli Di Placido, recreating iconic album covers for various hip hop albums, such as Doggystyle by Snoop Dogg, Stillmatic by Nas and Get Rich or Die Tryin' by 50 Cent. The second single, "Airplane Mode" featuring NSG, was released on 20 August 2020 alongside a music video.

The release of official merchandise for Crabs in a Bucket was also released alongside the CD copy on 28 August 2020 via Warner Music & Nines' official site.

A short film written and directed by Nines titled after the album was released on 27 August 2020.

Critical reception

Crabs in a Bucket received positive reviews from critics. For Clash, Tochi Imo complimented Nines' consistency in his musical approach: "Whilst greater experimentation would've been met with appreciation, one of Nines' most notable characteristics is his ability to stay true to his experiences despite growing commercial success, so I can’t be disappointed with a tape that exudes such authenticity. Although the whole album has clear themes, each track tells a story of its own and here, Nines anchors himself as one of the UK's best storytellers."

Commercial performance
In the chart week ending 4 September 2020, Crabs in a Bucket debuted at number 1 on the UK Albums Chart. It was the most streamed and most downloaded album of the chart week, overtaking the midweek chart topper S&M2 by Metallica in the final day of sales by 2,000 units. The album was involved in a tight chart race that ended with 5,000 sale units between the top five. The peak consolidated Nines as one of the few UK rappers to achieve a number one album, alongside Tinie Tempah, Stormzy, Dave, Plan B, The Streets and J Hus.

Track listing

Sample credits
 "Don't Change" contains a sample of "Don't Change", written by Eric McCaine, Athena Cage, Lavonn Battle and Tabitha Duncan, and performed by Kut Klose.

Personnel
 Nines – vocals
 Frank 'Maestro' Yamoah - Engineering (Dubai/Spain)
 Adam Lunn – Engineering, mixing
 Jay Reynolds – Mixing (all tracks except "Intro"), additional production ("Airplane Mode")
 Christopher Hewitt – Mixing Assistant (all tracks except "Intro"), Vocal Engineer ("Ringaling")
 Kevin Tuffy - Mastering

Charts

Certifications

Release history

References

2020 albums
Nines (rapper) albums